The Chiribaya Dog or Peruvian Shepherd Dog is an extinct pre-Columbian breed of dog from the southwest of Peru. It has been established that it was a  llama herding dog. The dogs were not only an important part of the social structure of the ancient Peruvians, but they received special treatment after death as well. The remains were 1,000 years old.

Mummies
The dogs were found buried in cemeteries next to 42 human mummies of the Chiribaya culture that flourished on the Ilo District, Moquegua Region, on the southern coast of Peru, who seem to have buried their pets with all the honors of a faithful friend and co-worker. The finding is due to the research of anthropologist Sonia Guillén, who specializes in the study of ancient mummies from prosperous pre-Columbian cultures from the Chachapoyas to the shores of Moquegua. The mummies date from the "late middle" period, c. 900 to 1350 CE.

In the port area of Ilo is Mallqui Center (from the word for 'mummy' in the Quechua language), dedicated to research regarding Chiribaya culture. This society developed as a chiefdom. Their territory has a feature that is the dream of every archaeologist: its soil is extremely dry, and it contains large amounts of nitrates, which ensured the preservation of the physical remains of those who inhabited this place.

Sonia Guillén argues that the tomb of a person reflects his or her social, political and religious position within their society. In the case of these dogs, the tombs suggest that, having completed a productive life within the Chiribaya civilization, they received good treatment, whether dead or alive.

Martha Meier Miró Quesada, a journalist, producer and documentary filmmaker and her team were able to record in pictures the findings and Sonia Guillen's investigations and in 2006 produced a documentary titled El Perro Pastor Chiribaya ('The Chiribaya Shepherd Dog').

Features 
Ermanno Maniero, president of the Kennel Club of Peru, and veterinary doctor Viviana Fernández of the National University of San Marcos thoroughly examined the mummies found and determined that these dogs were short-legged, and were longer than they were tall; had an abundant variety of hair colors that could vary between yellow and red, some with dark spots on the back or head; had cropped ears and falls; and had feet like those of a hare, allowing the animal to move on sand or soil with less effort, a quality that perhaps was important in the Chiribayas' environment.

The BBC reported even more features: The dog was small, had a long snout, was beige in color, with long fur and resembled a small Golden Retriever.

Grazing
The Chiribayas developed a coastal economy, with the use of the fishing and other marine resources, but also engaged in agriculture, including intensive use of livestock. Textiles and petroglyphs realize the llama-focused livestock activity of Chiribaya people, which underlines the importance of the "shepherd" (herding) dog in their society. According to research conducted by geneticist Jane Wheeler, who worked in the middle valley of Ilo and studied the remains of the llamas and the alpacas in the region, the Chiribayas raised a type of llama that had the longest, finest hair, but it was ignored by the Spanish conquerors, who used these llamas as pack animals, causing their demise. "Having so many llamas, the Chiribayas needed herding dogs. Then, they became co-workers with the people so that their death produced honor", says Sonia Guillén.

Lineage
The mummies of the Chiribaya dogs led researchers to initially hypothesize that the variety's descendants remain to this day. This seemed anecdotally confirmed by the similarity between the preserved remains and many of the dogs living in Ilo port, Tambo Valley, and the city of Mollendo (Arequipa Department). Even the dog "Abdul", the watchdog of the facilities of the Mallqui Center, was thought to perhaps be a descendant of the Chiribaya dogs. Its yellow fur, drooping ears and short snout match the characteristics of the mummies. Martha Meier drew attention to this detail, saying that the local dogs called chusco match the known characteristics of a Chiribaya dog, so it would not be surprising that over the years, this has been spread throughout Peru: "What we do now is regain the purity of the breed of dog. So let's start working to gather DNA of dogs in the Ilo area for comparison with the mummies, and then begin a selection process and aging. It will take several years to work, but it is worth it", says the filmmaker.

DNA evidence
A study of mitochondrial DNA of the Chiribaya dogs found three haplotypes, two of them not found before.

In 2018, an analysis of DNA from the entire cell nucleus indicated that dogs entered North America from Siberia 4,500 years after humans did, were isolated for the next 9,000 years, and after contact with Europeans these no longer exist because they were replaced by Eurasian dogs. The pre-contact dogs exhibit a unique genetic signature that is now gone.

References

Further reading
 de Pastino, Blake (September 25, 2006). "Photo in the News: Dog Mummies Found in Ancient Peru Pet Cemetery". National Geographic News. Archived copy. This article has a photo of one of the mummies.
 Hall, Chris (November 12, 2013). "Archaeologists Find More Than 100 Mummified Dogs in Peru" Dogster via Latino Fox News. Archived copy. This article has another photo of one of the mummies and also a photo of the skeletons laid out on top of a body and a skeleton drawing of a modern retriever.

Archaeological sites in Peru
Dog breeds originating from Indigenous Americans
Dog breeds originating in Peru
Dog landraces
Extinct dog breeds